Delfino Edmondo Borroni (23 August 1898 – 26 October 2008), Knight of Vittorio Veneto, was, at age 110, Italy's oldest man, and the eleventh-oldest verified man in the world.

He was the last veteran of the Alpine Front in the First World War, following the June 2008 death of the penultimate Italian Francesco Domenico Chiarello. The last Austro-Hungarian veteran, Franz Künstler, died in May 2008. At the time of his death, there two other trench veterans survived: Britons Harry Patch and Frenchman Fernand Goux, who fought on the Western Front.

Borroni, a mechanic, was born in Giussago, in the province of Pavia; he was called up in January 1917, and assigned to the 6th Bersaglieri Regiment in March. He first saw action in the Pasubio Alpine massif, where he fought against the Austro-Hungarian forces. He also fought in Valsugana and at Caporetto, where, after being shot in the heel while on a dangerous reconnaissance mission, he was captured as an Austrian prisoner of war and was forced to dig trenches until he managed to escape in the last days of the war.

He was seriously wounded as a civilian, a tram driver, in an Allied air raid during World War II.

His death was noted in the news. The Italian Government's Defense Minister Ignazio La Russa attended the funeral.

See also
 Last surviving World War I veteran by country

References

External links
 Official site
 At age 106
 Obituary in La Stampa
Article in Times

1898 births
2008 deaths
People from the Province of Pavia
Italian military personnel of World War I
Italian supercentenarians
Knights of the Order of Vittorio Veneto
Men supercentenarians